The following is a list of the 246 communes of the Cantal department of France.

Intercommunalities 

The communes cooperate in the following intercommunalities (as of 2020):
 (CABA)    Communauté d'agglomération du Bassin d'Aurillac
 (CCCGC)   Communauté de communes de Cère et Goul en Carladès
 (CCCC)    Communauté de communes de la Châtaigneraie Cantalienne
 (CCMS)    Communauté de communes du Massif du Sancy (partly)
 (CCPG)    Communauté de communes du Pays Gentiane
 (CCPM)    Communauté de communes du Pays de Mauriac
 (CCPS)    Communauté de communes du Pays de Salers
 (CCSA)    Communauté de communes Sumène Artense
 (HTC)     Hautes Terres Communauté
 (SFC)     Saint-Flour Communauté

List of communes

References

Cantal